Ludwig Karl Hilberseimer (September 14, 1885 – May 6, 1967) was a German architect and urban planner best known for his ties to the Bauhaus and to Mies van der Rohe, as well as for his work in urban planning at Armour Institute of Technology (now Illinois Institute of Technology), in Chicago, Illinois.

Life
Hilberseimer studied architecture at the Karlsruhe Technical University from 1906 to 1910.  He left before completing a degree. Afterward he worked in the architectural office Behrens and Neumark. Until 1914 he was coworker in the office of Heinz Lassen in Bremen. Later he led the planning office for Zeppelinhallenbau in Berlin Staaken. Beginning in 1919 he was member of the Arbeitsrat für Kunst and November Group, worked as independent architect and town planner and published numerous theoretical writings over art, architecture and town construction.
 
In 1929 Hilberseimer was hired by Hannes Meyer to teach at the Bauhaus at Dessau, Germany. In July 1933 Hilberseimer and Wassily Kandinsky were the two members of the Bauhaus that the Gestapo identified as problematically left-wing.  Like many members of the Bauhaus, he fled Germany for America. He arrived in 1938 to work for Mies van der Rohe in Chicago while heading the department of urban planning at IIT College of Architecture. Hilberseimer also became director of Chicago's city planning office.

Work
Street hierarchy was first elaborated by Ludwig Hilberseimer in his book City Plan, 1927. Hilberseimer emphasized safety for school-age children to walk to school while increasing the speed of the vehicular circulation system.

Beginning in 1929 at the Bauhaus, Hilberseimer developed studies concerning town construction for the decentralization of large cities. Against the background of the economic and political fall of the Weimar Republic he developed a universal and global adaptable planning system (The new town center, 1944), which planned a gradual dissolution of major cities and a complete penetration of landscape and settlement. He proposed that in order to create a sustainable relationship between humans, industry, and nature, human habitation should be built in a way to secure all people against all disasters and crises.

His most notable built project is Lafayette Park, Detroit, an urban renewal project designed in cooperation with architect Mies van der Rohe and landscape architect Alfred Caldwell.

The Ludwig Karl Hilberseimer Papers collection, including drawings, photographs, and other printerial material, is held by the Ryerson & Burnham Libraries in the Art Institute of Chicago.

Published writings
Building of large cities; Aposs - publishing house, Hanover, 1925
Large-town architecture; Julius Hoffman publishing house, Stuttgart, 1927
Concrete as Form; with Dr. Julius Vi, Julius Hoffmann publishing house, Stuttgart, 1928
International new architecture; Julius Hofmann publishing house, Stuttgart, 1928
Hall constructions; J.M. Gerhardt, Leipzig, 1931
The New City. Principles of Planning; Paul Theobald, Chicago, 1944. ASIN B0007DTJQQ.
The New Regional Pattern. Industries and Gardens. Workshops and Farms; Paul Theobald, Chicago, 1949. ASIN B0007DW0NA.
The Nature of Cities. Origin, Growth, and Decline. Pattern and Form. Planning Problems; Paul Theobald, Chicago, 1955
Mies van der Rohe; Paul Theobald, Chicago, 1956
Entfaltung einer Planungsidee; Bauwelt Fundamente 6, Berlin, Frankfurt, Wien, 1963
Contemporary Architecture, Its Roots and Trends; Paul Theobald, Chicago, 1964
Berlin architecture of the 20s; Florian copper mountain publishing house, Mainz, new building house books, 1967

Notes

1885 births
1967 deaths
20th-century German architects
German urban planners
Modernist architects from Germany
Academic staff of the Bauhaus
Karlsruhe Institute of Technology alumni
Illinois Institute of Technology faculty
Architects from Karlsruhe

 In the light of Hilberseimer, Plácido González Martínez Vibok Works (2016)